Johan Sæterhaug (27 March 1893 – 6 July 1968) was a Norwegian boxer who competed in the 1920 Summer Olympics.

In 1920 he was eliminated in the second round of the lightweight class after losing his fight to the upcoming bronze medalist Clarence Newton.

He represented the club SK Brage. He was a brother of Olympic cyclist Martin Sæterhaug.

References

1893 births
1968 deaths
Lightweight boxers
Olympic boxers of Norway
Boxers at the 1920 Summer Olympics
Norwegian male boxers
20th-century Norwegian people